Nash-Williams is a Welsh surname. It may refer to:
Crispin Nash-Williams (1932–2001), mathematician
Victor Erle Nash-Williams (1897–1955), archeologist

Others
Nash-Williams theorem of graph theory

See also
Nash (surname)
Williams (surname)

Compound surnames
Surnames of Welsh origin